Sir John Lauder, 1st Baronet, of Newington and Fountainhall (1595 – 2 April 1692) was a notable Scottish baillie and Treasurer of the City of Edinburgh, who was raised to a Nova Scotia baronetcy in 1688.

Antecedents
Lauder was born at Melville Mill and baptised 17 August 1595 at Lasswade church, the son of Andrew Lauder of Melville Mill, Lasswade (d. June 1658) and his first wife, Janet (d. April 1617), daughter of David Ramsay of Polton and Hillhead. His son, Sir John Lauder, Lord Fountainhall, recorded his ancestry in his Holograph Notes. He gives the 1st baronet's father as Andrew Lauder, and his father as William Lauder, a "second brother of [Robert] Lauder of that Ilk", sons of Richard Lauder, younger, of that Ilk (k. June 1567).

As John Lauder of Newington he matriculated Arms with the Lord Lyon King of Arms c. 1672 as descended of a second son of Lauder of that Ilk.

Merchant career and estates
Lauder, mentioned in his mother's Testament, became a highly successful merchant-burgess in Edinburgh, being admitted as a Burgess on 23 November 1636. He served as Treasurer of the City of Edinburgh in 1652, and as bailie from 1657 to 1661. He purchased (before 1672) the estate of Newington, Edinburgh, and subsequently (10 June 1681) the lands of Woodhead and Templehall, which along with others in Edinburghshire and Haddingtonshire, were erected by Crown charter into the feudal barony of Fountainhall on 13 August 1681. He later purchased the lands of Idingtoun (now Edington) near Chirnside, Berwickshire, from his third father-in-law, George Ramsay of Idingtoun.

Marriages
Lauder married three times: (1) 20 November 1639, at Edinburgh, Margaret (1618–1643) daughter of James Speirs by his wife Catherine née Curie; (2) 17 July 1643 at Edinburgh, Isabel (27 July 1628 – 2 February 1669), daughter of Alexander Ellis of Mortonhall and Stanhopmilnes by his wife Elisabeth, daughter of Nicol Edward, Dean of Guild in Edinburgh; (3) 15 February 1670, Margaret, daughter of George Ramsay of Idingtoun (of the Dalhousie family), by his wife Margaret Seton. After Lauder's death his widow married William Cunninghame, younger of Brounhill, sometime Provost of Ayr.

Baronetcy
On 17 July 1688, he was created a baronet, of Fountainhall, East Lothian in the Baronetage of Nova Scotia, with special remainder to the eldest surviving male heir of his third marriage. This patent was successfully contested and "reduced" (cancelled)

on 19 February 1692 having been replaced on 25 January 1690 with a new Letters Patent altering the succession to include his eldest surviving son from any marriage.

He died on 2 April 1692, in his 97th year and was interred in the Lauder vault within Greyfriars Kirk. He had, in all, twenty-four children by his three wives and was succeeded in the baronetcy by his eldest surviving son (of his second marriage) Sir John Lauder, 2nd Baronet, later Lord Fountainhall.

References

Burke's Peerage & Baronetage, London, 8th edition, 1845, and 32nd edition, 1870, under 'Lauder'.
The Grange of St.Giles, by J. Stewart Smith, Edinburgh, 1898.
Journals of Sir John Lauder, Lord Fountainhall, 1665-1676, edited by Donald Crawford, Scottish History Society publication, Edinburgh, 1900, where Sir John gives his ancestry.
The Complete Baronetage, by G. E. Cokayne, Exeter, 1904, under 'Lauder', pp. 360–363. (Cokayne is erroneous in his remarks in the genealogical preamble. He cites as his authority a funeral escutcheon he viewed which he states in the footnote on p. 360 as being that of the 1st baronet. It is, in fact, the escutcheon of the 2nd baronet, John Lauder, Lord Fountainhall, the Lyon Office not holding one for the 1st baronet).

1595 births
1692 deaths
Scottish businesspeople
Baronets in the Baronetage of Nova Scotia
Burgesses in Scotland
People from Midlothian